Kidokuga is a genus of tussock moths in the family Erebidae. The genus was erected by Yasunori Kishida in 2010. It is considered a synonym of the related genus Euproctis by some authors, but recognized as valid by others (e.g.), and supported as distinct in molecular phylogenetic studies.

Species
Kidokuga piperita (Oberthür, 1880)
Kidokuga torasan (Holland, 1889)

References

Lymantriinae
Noctuoidea genera